Qeshlaq-e Pavrud (also Romanized as Qeshlāq-e Pāvrūd) is a village in Darram Rural District, in the Central District of Tarom County, Zanjan Province, Iran. At the 2006 census, its population was 554, in 139 families.

References 

Populated places in Tarom County